William Hamlyn-Harris (born 14 January 1978 in Port Vila, Vanuatu) is a male javelin thrower from Australia. His personal best is 85.60 metres, achieved in January 2004 in Canberra.

Achievements

Seasonal bests by year
2001 - 77.23
2002 - 79.52
2003 - 81.82
2004 - 85.60
2006 - 79.89
2007 - 71.61
2008 - 74.96

References

2006 Commonwealth Games profile

1978 births
Living people
Australian male javelin throwers
Athletes (track and field) at the 2004 Summer Olympics
Olympic athletes of Australia
Commonwealth Games medallists in athletics
Commonwealth Games silver medallists for Australia
Universiade medalists in athletics (track and field)
Athletes (track and field) at the 2002 Commonwealth Games
Athletes (track and field) at the 2006 Commonwealth Games
Universiade bronze medalists for Australia
Medalists at the 2003 Summer Universiade
20th-century Australian people
21st-century Australian people
Medallists at the 2006 Commonwealth Games